The Stollgraben is an old artificial watercourse in Saxony-Anhalt, Germany.

See also 
List of rivers of Saxony-Anhalt

References 

Rivers of Saxony-Anhalt
Rivers of Germany